Paul Kammerer (17 August 1880, in Vienna – 23 September 1926, in Puchberg am Schneeberg) was an Austrian biologist who studied and advocated Lamarckism, the theory that organisms may pass to their offspring characteristics acquired in their lifetime.

Biography

Education
He began his academic career at the Vienna Academy by studying music but graduated with a degree in biology.

Biological research

Kammerer's work in biology largely involved altering the breeding and development of amphibians. He made ovoviviparous fire salamanders become viviparous, and viviparous alpine salamanders become ovoviviparous.

In lesser-known experiments, he manipulated and bred olms. He made olms produce live young and bred dark-colored olms with full vision. He supported the Lamarckian theory of heritability of acquired characteristics, and he experimented extensively in an effort to prove the theory.

Kammerer succeeded in making midwife toads breed in the water by increasing the temperature of their tanks, forcing them to retreat to the water to cool off. The male midwife toads were not genetically programmed for underwater mating so over the span of two generations, Kammerer reported that his midwife toads were exhibiting black nuptial pads on their feet to give them more traction in this underwater mating process.

While the prehistoric ancestors of midwife toads had the pads, Kammerer considered the pads to be an acquired characteristic brought about by adaptation to environment.

Accusations of fraud
Claims arose that the result of the toad experiment had been falsified. The most notable of these was made by Dr Gladwyn Kingsley Noble, Curator of Reptiles at the American Museum of Natural History, in the scientific journal Nature. After a microscopic examination, Noble claimed that the black pads actually had a far more mundane explanation: they had simply been injected with India ink.

In a letter, Kammerer stated that after reading Noble's paper, he re-examined his specimen and confirmed that India ink had been injected into the pads. Kammerer suggested that his specimens had been altered by a laboratory assistant. Criminologist Edward Sagarin wrote, "Kammerer maintained his total innocence and declared his ignorance of the forger's identity. There is still doubt about whether an obliging (or hostile) assistant was responsible for the forgery, but Kammerer's scientific credibility was nevertheless irremediably damaged".

Science historian Peter J. Bowler wrote that most biologists believe that Kammerer was a fraud and that even the others claim that he misinterpreted the results of his experiments.

Seriality theory
Kammerer's other passion was collecting coincidences. He published a book with the title Das Gesetz der Serie (The Law of the Series, never translated into English) in which he recounted some 100 anecdotes of coincidences that had led him to formulate his theory of seriality.

He postulated that all events are connected by waves of seriality. The unknown forces would cause what is perceived as just the peaks, or groupings and coincidences. Kammerer was known, for example, to make notes in public parks of what numbers of people were passing by, how many carried umbrellas etc. Albert Einstein called the idea of seriality "interesting, and by no means absurd", and Carl Jung drew upon Kammerer's work in his essay Synchronicity. Arthur Koestler reported that when he was doing research for his biography on Kammerer, he was subjected to "a meteor shower" of coincidences, as if Kammerer's ghost were grinning down at him and saying, "I told you so!"

Death
Six weeks after the accusation by Noble, Kammerer committed suicide in the forest of Schneeberg, an event which is discussed by Arthur Koestler in his book on Kammerer and his theories.

Later Controversy

Attempts to reproduce Kammerer's experiments
The Lamarckian biologist Ernest MacBride supported the experiments of Kammerer but commented that they would have to be repeated to be accepted by other scientists. The British zoologist Harold Munro Fox attempted to replicate some of Kammerer's experiments but produced negative results. Biology professor Harry Gershenowitz also attempted to duplicate Kammerer's experiment with a related species, Bombina orientalis; but he had to terminate the experiment for lack of funds.

The Case of the Midwife Toad
Interest in Kammerer revived in 1971 with the publication of Arthur Koestler's book The Case of the Midwife Toad. Koestler thought that Kammerer's experiments on the midwife toad may have been tampered with by a Nazi sympathizer at the University of Vienna. Certainly, as Koestler writes, "the Hakenkreuzler, the swastika-wearers, as the Austrian Nazis of the early days were called, were growing in power. One center of ferment was the University of Vienna where, on the traditional Saturday morning student parades, bloody battles were fought. Kammerer was known by his public lectures and newspaper articles as an ardent pacifist and Socialist; it was also known that he was going to build an institute in Soviet Russia. An act of sabotage in the laboratory would have been… in keeping with the climate of those days."

Koestler's claims have been criticized by the scientific community. Gordon Stein noted:

As a consequence of Noble's refutation, interest in Lamarckian inheritance diminished except in the Soviet Union where it was championed by Trofim Lysenko.

Other interpretations
Sander Gliboff, a historian of biology and professor in the Department of History and Philosophy of Science, Indiana University, has commented that although Kammerer's conclusions proved false, his evidence was probably genuine and he did not simply argue for Lamarckism and against Darwinism as the theories are now understood. Rather, beyond the scandal, the story shows us much about the competing theories of biological and cultural evolution and the range of new ideas about heredity and variation in early 20th-century biology and the changes in experimental approach that have occurred since then.

In 2009, developmental biologist Alexander Vargas, Professor in the Department of Biology, University of Chile, suggested that the inheritance of acquired traits (Lamarckian inheritance) that Kammerer reported to observe in his toad experiments could be authentic and be explained by results from the emerging field of epigenetics. Kammerer could thus actually be considered the discoverer of non-Mendelian, epigenetic inheritance, with chemical modifications to parental DNA (such as through DNA methylation) being passed on to subsequent generations. Furthermore, In Vargas' view, the parent-of-origin effect, which was poorly understood at the time of Kammerer's, might be explained retrospectively, in relation to similar effects seen in other organisms. Professor Gliboff of Indiana University has subsequently argued that Vargas "constructed his model without first reading Kammerer's original articles" and is "seriously misinformed about what Kammerer did and what the results even were" so Vargas's "model... cannot explain the results... originally reported...". Gliboff goes on to challenge strong that Kammerer was given credit for discovery of parent-of-origin effect and states that "Vargas' historical inferences about the Kammerer affair... [and] negative reactions of geneticists... are unsupported and do not stand up to scrutiny".

The reinterpretation of Kammerer's work, in light of epigenetics, remains thus controversial.

References

Further reading

External links
 
 A collection of his texts – Paul Kammerer's site in Academia.edu

1880 births
1926 suicides
Academy of Fine Arts Vienna alumni
20th-century Austrian zoologists
Austrian Jews
Lamarckism
People involved in scientific misconduct incidents
Scientists from Vienna
Suicides by firearm in Austria